This is a list of all the opinions written by Frank Iacobucci during his tenure as puisne justice of the Supreme Court of Canada.

1991

1992

1993

1994

1995

1996

1997

1998

1999

 Pearlman v Manitoba Law Society Judicial Committee, [1991] 2 SCR 869
 London Drugs Ltd v Kuehne & Nagel International Ltd, [1992] 3 SCR 299
 R v V (KB), [1993] 2 SCR 857
 Adler v Ontario, [1996] 3 SCR 609 
 Vriend v Alberta, (1998)
 Re Rizzo & Rizzo Shoes Ltd, [1998] 1 SCR 27

 Note: This part of the list is incomplete

2000

2001

2002

2003

2004

Iacobucci